John Joseph "Perky" Perkovich (March 10, 1924 – September 16, 2000) was a pitcher in Major League Baseball. He played for the Chicago White Sox.

References

External links

1924 births
2000 deaths
Major League Baseball pitchers
Chicago White Sox players
Baseball players from Chicago